Gerardo Moreno Cruz (born 29 November 1993) is a Mexican professional footballer who plays as a defender.

Club career
Moreno signed for Pumas UNAM in the summer of 2020.

References

External links
 

Living people
1993 births
Mexican footballers
Association football defenders
C.F. Monterrey players
Correcaminos UAT footballers
Tampico Madero F.C. footballers
Cimarrones de Sonora players
Liga MX players
Ascenso MX players
Tercera División de México players
Footballers from Tamaulipas
Sportspeople from Tampico, Tamaulipas